"Yes" (stylized YES) is a song by Dutch DJ Sam Feldt. It features American R&B singer Akon, was written by Sam Feldt, Thomas Troelsen, Lunchmoney Lewis, and S. Martin and produced by Feldt alongside Troelsen and Kaj Melsen. It was released on 10 August 2017 as the lead single from Feldt's upcoming debut album Sunrise.

Background
Billboard described the song as "summery and sexual, catchy and laid-back." The song is composed of smooth tropical vibes and synth-based melody with a slowed tempo.

Music video
Directed by Deni Kukura, the music video features body-painted ladies who dances around with Akon.

Charts

References

2017 songs
2017 singles
Deep house songs
Akon songs
Electronic songs
Sam Feldt songs
Spinnin' Records singles
Songs written by Thomas Troelsen
Songs written by LunchMoney Lewis